JBXE is an Extreme E racing team. The team was founded by the 2009 Formula One World Champion, Jenson Button, and takes part in the series that is highlighting the impacts of climate change.

History

In January 2021, it was announced that Jenson Button had founded his own team for the newly established racing series. The name "JBXE" takes its name from the initials of Jenson Button, with the XE standing for Extreme E. It was initially announced that Button would be driving in the team himself alongside Mikaela Åhlin-Kottulinsky. However, Button decided to step down as the driver of his own team after the team's debut race and was replaced by Kevin Hansen. With a second-place finish in the final race of the inaugural season, JBXE secured third place overall, beating the Andretti United Extreme E by 2 points. 

In the 2022 season, Molly Taylor (round 1), Hedda Hosås (rounds 2 to 5), Kevin Hansen (rounds 1 to 4) and Fraser McConnell (round 5) raced for JBXE. The team finished the season in nineth place.

JBXE retained Hosås and signed Heikki Kovalainen for the 2023 season.

Team results

Racing overview

Racing summary

Complete Extreme E results

(Races in bold indicate best qualifiers; races in italics indicate fastest super sector)

References

British auto racing teams
Auto racing teams established in 2021